William Edward Woodruff (December 24, 1795 – June 19, 1885) was an American politician and publisher who served as the first state treasurer of Arkansas from 1836 to 1838. He also served as the 10th postmaster of Little Rock from 1845 to 1846. Woodruff was the first publisher of a major Arkansas newspaper.

Biography 
William Edward Woodruff was born on December 24, 1795, in Suffolk County (Long Island), New York. He was apprenticed to a Brooklyn printer at the age of 14, and, in 1818, headed west to work in Kentucky, Tennessee, and finally the newly created Arkansas Territory, founding The Arkansas Gazette in November 1819.

Woodruff died in Little Rock on June 19, 1885, and is buried in the historic Mount Holly Cemetery. Woodruff County, Arkansas, is named for him.

References

External links 

 William E. Woodruff at Encyclopedia of Arkansas
 
 William E. Woodruff at The Political Graveyard
 

1795 births
1885 deaths
19th-century American male writers
19th-century American newspaper editors
19th-century American newspaper founders
19th-century American politicians
Arkansas Democrats
Arkansas postmasters
Burials at Mount Holly Cemetery
People from Arkansas County, Arkansas
People from Long Island
People from Suffolk County, New York
Politicians from Little Rock, Arkansas
Polk administration personnel
State treasurers of Arkansas